René Díaz is a retired Cuban hammer thrower.

He won the gold medal at the 1986 Central American and Caribbean Junior Championships, the silver medal at the 1986 Pan American Junior Athletics Championships, the gold medal at the 1989 Central American and Caribbean Championships, the bronze medal at the 1990 Central American and Caribbean Games, and the bronze medal at the 1991 Pan American Games. He became Cuban champion in 1990 and 1991.

References

Year of birth missing (living people)
Living people
Cuban male hammer throwers
Central American and Caribbean Games bronze medalists for Cuba
Pan American Games bronze medalists for Cuba
Athletes (track and field) at the 1991 Pan American Games
Pan American Games medalists in athletics (track and field)
Central American and Caribbean Games medalists in athletics
Competitors at the 1990 Central American and Caribbean Games
Medalists at the 1991 Pan American Games
20th-century Cuban people